Quadra is the fifteenth studio album by Brazilian heavy metal band Sepultura, released on February 7, 2020. It is a concept album based on numerology, the number four and its significance as depicted on Quadrivium. The band went to Sweden to work with producer Jens Bogren for the recording of Quadra.

The album is the band's most successful record since 1998's Against, charting in 17 countries and entering the top 20 in seven countries (eight, considering the UK Rock & Metal Albums Chart). It is also their most successful album in Germany and Switzerland to date, exceeding the chart positions of Roots (1996), with positions number five and number 13, respectively.

Concept
Guitarist Andreas Kisser explained that the concept of the album is based on Quadrivium, which are the four subjects, or arts (namely arithmetic, geometry, music, and astronomy), taught after teaching the trivium. The word is Latin, meaning four ways.

Based on this, the band divided the 12-track album into four sections of three songs each. The first being thrash metal songs, based on the classic Sepultura sound. The second section is inspired by the groove-percussion oriented sound the band explored in Roots. The third part has more progressive songs inspired by the track "Iceberg Dances" from Machine Messiah, but is not all instrumental tracks. Side four features slow-paced and melodic tracks, similar to the song "Machine Messiah".

Quadra is also the Portuguese term for sports court. Kisser stated that "everyone grows up in a different Quadra, shaped by rules and definitions. We are all determined by these concepts, our relationships, our careers. Our whole lives."

When Derrick Green was asked during an interview with BraveWords, "Which Sepultura album are you most proud of?", he replied, "Definitely Quadra. It's the latest album, and we really worked so hard on it. We have so many different elements from the past that have helped us get to here – where we are at right now. So, without a doubt in my mind, this is the strongest album that we've done together. And I'm extremely proud of it."

Reception

Quadra received positive reviews. Thom Jurek of AllMusic wrote in a review: "Quadra is Sepultura's first album to actually stand on equal qualitative footing with their classic trilogy. It offers a series of tough, meaty, adventurous songs, that abundantly indulge raw power and emotion. Bogren's production and Sepultura's execution are in perfect balance. Further, Green delivers a career-defining performance here. It is the first Sepultura album in decades to measure favorably alongside the band's classic output". Blabbermouth's Dom Lawson wrote that Quadra "plainly and loudly showcases the sound of a band at the height of their powers, both in terms of creativity and musicianship" and calls the album "one of their finest records yet".

Metalriot.com chose Quadra as their number one album of 2020. Morgan Y. Evans wrote that the album ,"...is nothing short of a monument to a lifetime in metal, the determined triumph of a legacy name never saying die and following their trusted vision over popular opinion. Quadra works on every level. In a year filled with so much death even the band's name vibrates on some heavy karmic level, but "Isolation" especially resonates deeply in a time of so much social upheaval for justice reform." 

The website Collector's Room included Quadra on the top 50 Brazilian metal albums of all time. Metal Hammer named it as the 30th best metal album of 2020.

At the 2020 Metal Storm Awards, the album won a Metal Storm Award for Best Thrash Metal Album.

Track listing

Recorded live at the Audio Club in São Paulo, Brazil on June 20, 2015

Personnel

Sepultura
Derrick Green − vocals
Andreas Kisser − guitars
Paulo Jr. − bass
Eloy Casagrande − drums, percussion

Guests
Emmily Barreto − guest vocals on track 12
Paulo Cyrino − heavy dubstep elements on track 5
Kadu Fernandes − percussion on track 4
Francesco Ferrini − orchestral and key arrangements on tracks 3 and 12
Ingrid Misgeld − conductor of the Chorus Mysticus choir
Gunnar Misgeld − choir arrangements on track 1, 3, 7 and 11
Robertinho Rodrigues − acoustic bass
Renato Zanuto − keyboards, choir arrangements, orchestral and string arrangements on tracks 1, 4, 7 and 11
Bruna Zneti − violins

Charts

References

2020 albums
Sepultura albums
Nuclear Blast albums
Albums produced by Jens Bogren
Albums about climate change